Amanda Yvette Bingson (born February 20, 1990) is an American track and field athlete specializing in the hammer throw. She is the former American record holder in the event with a distance of  set at the 2013 USA Outdoor Track and Field Championships.

Bingson attended school at the University of Nevada, Las Vegas where she is a school record holder and majored in interdisciplinary studies.  She had only taken up the hammer throw in 2009 as a college freshman and has continued to improve since then.  A month before the trials, she finished fourth at the NCAA Women's Outdoor Track and Field Championships.  Prior to that, she was a shot put and discus thrower at Silverado High School in Las Vegas, where her team won the state championship twice and where she finished second in the 2008 shot put.

She qualified to join the Olympic team by finishing second in the hammer throw at the 2012 United States Olympic Trials, throwing  (reaching the A standard) in the 4th round. At the Olympics, she did not advance past the qualifying round, finishing 28th overall.

Bingson appeared on one of the covers for the 2015 ESPN The Magazine The Body Issue.

Amanda Bingson placed fourth in hammer behind Team USA teammates Amber Campbell, Gwen Berry and DeAnna Price at 2016 United States Olympic Trials (track and field) and was an alternate to represent the United States in the hammer at the 2016 Olympics.

Education
 Silverado High School in Las Vegas, Nevada, 2008
 University of Nevada, Las Vegas, Interdisciplinary Studies, formerly Sociology, 2013

Family
She and her older sister, Morgan, are the two daughters of Sue and Pat Bingson of Paradise, Nevada.

Achievements

References

External links

1990 births
Living people
People from Victorville, California
Sportspeople from the Las Vegas Valley
Track and field athletes from California
American female hammer throwers
Olympic track and field athletes of the United States
Athletes (track and field) at the 2012 Summer Olympics
World Athletics Championships athletes for the United States
UNLV Rebels women's track and field athletes
USA Outdoor Track and Field Championships winners